Liwang is district headquarters and municipality in Rolpa District in Lumbini Province of southwestern Nepal. At the time of the 1991 Nepal census it had a population of 8425.

Media
To Promote local culture Liwang has one FM radio station Radio Rolpa FM - 93.8 MHz Which is a Community radio Station.
Liwang has three local radio. Community Radio Rolpa FM 93.8mhz, Community Radio Jaljala 96.4mhz and Community Radio Malashree 100.5mhz

References

Populated places in Rolpa District